Varkoliai (historically ) is a village in Kėdainiai district municipality, in Kaunas County, in central Lithuania. It is located by the western limit of the Kėdainiai city and Smilga river, nearby the Kėdainiai Air Base. According to the 2011 census, the village has a population of 0 people.

Demography

References

Villages in Kaunas County
Kėdainiai District Municipality